The indoor hockey competitions at the 2019 Southeast Asian Games in the Philippines were held at the LB Centro Mall & Convention Center in Los Banos, Laguna from 4 to 10 December 2019. There were competitions in two events (one event for each gender).

Indonesia had arrived with the intention of participating both their Men's and Women's Team. However, due to conflict back home with officiating clubs and the organization the FIH disallowed their participation. They had left a few days after this forced withdrawal of participation.

Participation

Participating nations

Men's tournament

Group stage

Medal round

Final standings

Women's tournament

Group stage

Medal round

Final standings

Medal summary

Medal table

Medalists

References

External links
 

 
2019
Southeast Asian Games
2019 Southeast Asian Games events